Judge Not may refer to:
 "Judge Not" (song), a single by Bob Marley
 Judge Not (1914 film), a 1914 Swedish film directed by Victor Sjöström
 Judge Not (1920 film), a 1920 British silent drama film
 Judge Not; or The Woman of Mona Diggings, a 1915 film starring Harry Carey

See also
Judge not lest ye be judged